The Tuvalulan Ambassador in New York City is the official representative of the Government in Funafuti to the Government of the United States. Since 2010, the Tuvaluan ambassador to the United States has also been appointed as Tuvalu’s Permanent Representative to the United Nations.

Tuvalu–United States relations

List of ambassadors

References

United States
Tuvalu
Permanent Representatives of Tuvalu to the United Nations
Ambassadors of Tuvalu to the United States